Karin Åhman-Svensson (born 30 March 1957) is a former Swedish footballer.  Åhman-Svensson was a member of the Swedish national team that won the 1984 European Competition for Women's Football.

References

1957 births
Living people
Damallsvenskan players
Öxabäcks IF players
Swedish women's footballers
Sweden women's international footballers
Women's association football midfielders
UEFA Women's Championship-winning players